Cowell Battery is a settlement on the island of Hassel near Saint Thomas in the United States Virgin Islands. The population of the settlement and entire island in 2012 was 10.
It was named after the British officer John Clayton Cowell of the Royal Regiment of Foot who was Governor of St Thomas during the British occupation of 1801–1802.

References

Populated places in Saint Thomas, U.S. Virgin Islands